Second Lieutenant Josiah M. Curtis (16 November 1844 to 17 June 1875) was an American soldier who fought in the American Civil War. Curtis received the country's highest award for bravery during combat, the Medal of Honor, for his action during the Third Battle of Petersburg in Virginia on 2 April 1865. He was honored with the award on 12 May 1865.

Biography
Curtis was born in Ohio County, West Virginia, on 16 November 1844. He enlisted into the 12th West Virginia Infantry. He died on 17 June 1875 and his remains are interred at the West Liberty Cemetery.

Medal of Honor citation

See also

List of American Civil War Medal of Honor recipients: A–F

References

1844 births
1875 deaths
People of West Virginia in the American Civil War
Union Army officers
United States Army Medal of Honor recipients
American Civil War recipients of the Medal of Honor